IATP is an acronym that may refer to:

 Institute for Agriculture and Trade Policy, see iatp.org
 International Airlines Technical Pool, see Turkish Technic
 Internet Access and Training Program
 Interactive Agent Transfer Protocol; see List of IP protocol numbers (Hex: 0x75, protocol: #117)